The State Department of Åland is a department of the Finnish central government for the administration of Åland, with a status corresponding to a Regional State Administrative Agency elsewhere in Finland. It replaced the Åland State Provincial Office on 1 January 2010, after the abolition of all provinces of Finland at the end of 2009.

Politics of Åland

External link 
 Statens ämbetsverk på Åland